List of rivers flowing in the province of West Java, Indonesia:

In alphabetical order

See also 
 List of rivers of Indonesia
 List of rivers of Java

References 

 
West Java